Ushuaia Department is a department of Argentina in Tierra del Fuego Province, Argentina. The capital city of the department is situated in Ushuaia.

Off the eastern end of the main island is Isla de los Estados (English: Staten Island, from the Dutch Stateneiland).

References

Departments of Tierra del Fuego Province, Argentina